A gubernatorial election was held in Jakarta on 8 August 2007 to elect the Governor of Jakarta for the five-year term between 2007 and 2012. It was the first direct election for the capital city. Incumbent Sutiyoso did not participate in the election, with his deputy Fauzi Bowo facing off against former police general Adang Daradjatun.

Fauzi Bowo, which received the political support of a major coalition of political parties, won the election and secured nearly 58% of the 3.6 million votes while his opponent received about 1.5 million despite being backed by just PKS.

Background
Prior to 2005, regional leaders such as governors and mayors were indirectly elected by the regional legislative body (Dewan Perwakilan Rakyat Daerah), which members were elected in public elections. It was not until 2005 when this system was replaced by direct elections for local areas.

The previous governor, Sutiyoso, was reelected for his second term through the indirect method with Fauzi Bowo as his deputy in September 2002, in a vote held in the midst of demonstrations against his governance. Observers described the results as "expected".

Candidates
Sitting vice governor Fauzi Bowo received the support of a major coalition of parties, while his opponent Anang Daradjatun only managed to secure the support of the Prosperous Justice Party - which had previously won the local elections of Jakarta's satellite cities of Bekasi and Depok. Outside the two, several other figures such as Agum Gumelar and Faisal Basri were also potential candidates, but did not manage to secure backing.

Then-academist Anies Baswedan noted the large amount of negotiations and transactions involved with the formation of the coalition.

Issues
The primary issues contested were chronic poverty and unemployment in addition to the city's traffic jams and annual flooding. Topics such as corruption and Islam's role in public life also became campaigning areas.

Fauzi Bowo's campaign in particular claimed that Daradjatun's governorship will result in limitations for the city's nightlife because of his backing from the islamist PKS. The latter denied this and in turn accused Fauzi of being indebted to his political backers. Daradjatun also accused the previous administration of incompetence.

Results
Following early vote counts, Anang-Dani conceded their defeat before the official results were released. Fauzi Bowo-Prijanto were officially declared as winners of the election on 16 August, after securing 2,109,511 (57.87%) of the votes while Anang gained 1,535,555 (42.13%) votes. The former pair won in all constituent cities (and the Thousand Islands Regency). The turnout of over 3.6 million voters (~65%) exceeded expectations.

Aftermath
The election was mentioned in a diplomatic cable brought up by WikiLeaks, which noted that "despite the intense press coverage of the election and its national importance, the Jakarta elites have rigged the game". Fauzi Bowo would later run again for his second term in 2012, in which he lost to Joko Widodo.

References

2007 Indonesian gubernatorial elections
August 2007 events in Asia
Elections in Jakarta